Seven Periods with Mr Gormsby is a satirical New Zealand television series, created and written by Danny Mulheron (who also directs and co-produces), Dave Armstrong, and Tom Scott. It stars David McPhail as the titular Mr Gormsby, whose politically incorrect attitudes and "old school" teaching style clash and contrast with the environment at the fictional Tepapawai High School. The show pokes fun at the New Zealand education system but also at modern New Zealand social attitudes more generally.

Plot 
The story follows various events at a New Zealand low-decile high school in a low-income area having often poorly-qualified teaching staff and many students with difficult socio-economic backgrounds - mostly belonging to ethnic minorities, Māori and Pasifika.

Characters
 Mortimer Ellis Gormsby (David McPhail) - Relief Teacher
 Roger Dascent (Paul McLaughlin) - The principal of Tepapawai Boys High School
 Steve Mudgeway (Jason Hoyte) - The school counsellor
 Fenn Partington (Tandi Wright) - English Teacher
 Lauren (Michele Amas) - Secretary
 Alisdair Morton (Thomas Robins) - Economics teacher
 Hone Hakanui (Louis Sutherland) - Māori studies teacher
 Werner Hundertwasser (Nigel Collins) - Head of Music
 Marion Patterson (Geraldine Brophy) - The Education Review Office school inspector
 Rak (Charles Lum) - School cleaner, formerly a nuclear physicist in Cambodia
 Agnes Maria Teresa O'Flaherty - (Dena Kennedy) Social Studies/History teacher
 Lesley Tangaroa (Grace Hoet)- P.E. teacher

Class 5F
 Emile Bastabus (Joseph Moore)
 Elvis Hohepa (R.J. Smiler)
 Afioga (Feterika Sage)
 Ama'ata'a Uleiata'aua Alupepe (Halaifonua Finau)  
 Govind (Hursh Saha)
 Minh (Samson Phommachack)
 Gareth le Tissier (Lyndon McGaughran)

Filming and broadcasting 
The series ran for two seasons; the first was broadcast in 2005 on TV ONE in New Zealand and the ABC TV in Australia.  The second series was shown in New Zealand in 2006 and in Australia, on ABC2, April 2008. DVDs of the series were sold in Australia through the ABC Shop. The series was nominated for Best Script and Best Comedy in the 2006 NZ Screen Awards.

The program was filmed at two schools in the suburbs of Lower Hutt: the first season at Wainuiomata College and the second at Petone College.

The first season's school's original location is now occupied by Wainuiomata Little Theatre. 
Address 106 Moohan St, Wainuiomata, Lower Hutt 5014, New Zealand ( 
Google map location)

Episode List

Series One

Series Two

Reception 
The series was received mostly positively by Australian critics, although some aspects of its politically incorrect nature raised some eyebrows.

Ray Cassin (The Age) writes that the series is attacking hypocrisy on all fronts and tries to unmasks deceits and pretensions with a rather relentless and gleeful insistence. Jim Schembri (Sydney Morning Herald) argues the show skating on thin ice due to its politically incorrect nature and sees it as another example of how far New Zealand is ahead of Australia when it comes to dealing with delicate matters through comedy. Alan Mascarenhas (The Age) states while the series has low production values and patchy acting it does nevertheless possess a pythonesque quality. He recalls that couldn't stop laughing even at scenes where he probably shouldn't have. According to him the show goes further than The Office ever dared balancing between fun and bigotry.

References

External links
 
 Characters of Seven Periods with Mr Gormsby (TVNZ)
 Seven Periods with Mr Gormsby: episode guide at the australian television information archive

2000s high school television series
2000s workplace comedy television series
2000s New Zealand television series
2005 New Zealand television series debuts
2006 New Zealand television series endings
New Zealand satirical television shows
Television series about educators
Television shows filmed in New Zealand
Television shows funded by NZ on Air
TVNZ 1 original programming